Rabbi Mordechai Hager (14 July 1922 (18 Tammuz 5682) - 16 March 2018 (29 Adar 5778),) was the Admor of Vizhnitz Hasidic sect for 46 years, and had a following of tens of thousands of chassidim.

Biography

Early life
He was born in Grossverdein to Rabbi Chaim Meir Hager (1888—1972), later the Vizhnitz Rebbe, and Margalia, the daughter of Rabbi Ze'ev Twersky, the Admor of Rachmastrivka.

From his childhood, he followed his grandfather, the Admor Rabbi Yisroel Hager (Ahavat Yisrael). At the age of 18 he went to study for a short period with Rebbe Yoel of Satmar. Reb Mottele also learned in Pupa under the late Pupa Rebbe.

He married Figa Malka, the daughter of Rabbi Yaakov Yosef Twersky, Zt"l (1899—1968), late Skverer Rebbe. After she died without children, he married her younger sister Sima Mirel and together they had 14 children, 8 sons and 6 daughters.

After World War II
After the Holocaust, on the 29th of Adar 5708 (1948), he arrived in the United States with his father-in-law and began serving as a rabbi of Vizhnitz Hassidim in the United States,  in Williamsburg.

Monsey
After a short while, he announced that he did not want to live in the crowded city and moved to Monsey.

After his father's death in 1972, his two sons were appointed as Admors of Vizhnitz as well, Rabbi Moshe Yehoshua Hager as Rebbe in Israel, and Rabbi Mordechai as Rebbe in the United States.

He established the Kaser village in Monsey in 1990 so it could build denser housing.
He met with US President Jimmy Carter together with Rabbi Shlomo of Bobov and Rabbi Moshe Teitelbaum of Satmar.

At the time of his death, he was the oldest Hasidic rabbi in the world. He was known for his devotion to learning Torah: he studied 18 hours a day and asked his Chasidim to study at least two hours every day. He had about 30,000 followers internationally.

During the last months of his life he was hospitalized at Mount Sinai Hospital in Manhattan, where he died on March 16, 2018 (29 Adar 5778). His funeral left the central Beit Midrash of his Hasidic sect in Monsey, "Levush Mordechai," on the eve of the Sabbath, and tens of thousands participated. During the funeral 72 US Dollars was distributed, according to his will to every Torah student who studied in the kollel, and his followers were asked to learn a Gemara page every day during the year (and the children a Mishnah). He was buried beside his son in an Ohel in the Vizhnitz cemetery in Monsey .

Views 
Rabbi Mordechai Hager had a world view similar to that of his grandfather, the Admor Rabbi Yisroel Hager (Ahavat Yisrael). During Seudah shlishit he used to protest against loopholes in religion. He had forbidden his followers to carry on Shabbos in Boro Park and Williamsburg, despite the Hechsher given to the local Eiruv by some of the city's rabbis. He would object to eating ice cream at the end of the meal, due to halakhic doubts regarding the laws of the brokhoys before enjoyment, and also for the purpose of celibacy of the pleasures of this world which is worthy of the servant of God, as he has clarified several times. He would object to being photographed, and even appealed to the editorial offices of the Haredi newspapers not to publish his pictures.  In addition to keeping a very strictly kosher diet, he was personally a pescatarian ovo-lacto-vegetarian, although he never expressed the main reason for this practice, and did not encourage others to follow his example.

Family
His wife died about a decade before him. After his death, his seven sons and one grandson (eldest son of his eldest son who had died before him) were appointed to succeed him as rabbis in their respective communities.
 Rabbi Pinchas Shalom (died 17 Sivan 5775 (2015) at age 67), rabbi of Torat Chaim Vizhnitz in Boro Park, was married to Zisel Reizel, daughter of Rebbe Shmuel Zvi Horowitz of Spinka.
 Rabbi Yaakov Yosef Hager, eldest son of Rabbi Pinchas Shalom, succeeded Rabbi Pinchas Shalom as Rabbi of Vizhnitz in Boro Park, and after Rabbi Mordechai's death, was appointed Rebbe of Vizhnitz in Boro Park. He is married to his cousin, daughter of Rabbi Avraham Dov Twersky, rabbi of the Rachmstrivika community in Monsey.
 Zippora, married to Rabbi Avraham Dov Twersky, rabbi of the Rachmastrivka congregation in Monsey, son of Rabbi Yochanan, Rebbe of Rachmastrivka.
Rabbi Yisroel, is Rabbi Mordechai's main successor as Rebbe of Vizhnitz in Monsey. Married to Miriam, daughter of Rabbi Eluzer Meisels of Uhel. he objects being photographed just like his father
 Malka Chana Rachel, married to Rabbi Israel Eliezer Fish, the Admor of Bixad in Williamsburg
 Rabbi Menachem Mendel, Admor of Kiamesha Lake in the Catskill Mountains. Previously served as rabbi of the local community of Torat Chaim Vizhnitz, which has about 150 families. He objects to being photographed and considered sharp and has separatist views as his father. Married to his cousin Feiga Shifra, daughter of Rabbi Chai Yitzchak Twersky, the Admor of Rachmastrivka, United States.
 Rabbi Yitzchak Yohanan, Admor of Vizhnitz in Williamsburg, previously served as Rabbi of the local community of Vizhnitz.  Married to Chaya Mindel, daughter of Rabbi Moshe of Kiviashd.
 Hinda, married to Rabbi Yossef Benzion Rotenberg, the Admor of Koson in Boro Park.
 Rabbi Eliezer Ze'ev Hager, was crowned Admor of Vizhnitz in Jerusalem, but lives in the United States. Previously served as rabbi of "Torat Chaim Vizhnitz" on Adoniyahu HaCohen Street in Jerusalem. A medical activist and rabbi of a Beit Midrash of the Chassidus in Boro Park. Son-in-law of Rabbi David Twersky, Admor of Skwere in Boro Park. (His son is Isaac Hager.)
 Rabbi David Hager, Admor of Vizhnitz in London. He serves as the Rebbe of Khal Imrei Chaim D'chasidai Viznitz London and the local Vizhnitz community which consists of around 270 families. Married to Chana Miriam, daughter of Rabbi Moshe Taub of Kalov, United States. Like his father-in-law, he is engaged in Orthodox Judaism outreach
 Rabbi Aharon, Admor of Vizhnitz in Montreal. Formerly served as rabbi of the local "Ahavat Yisrael Vizhnitz" congregation. Married to Sarah, daughter of Rabbi Naftali Aryeh Taub of Kaliv, United States.
 Chava Reizel, married to her cousin Rabbi Aharon Menachem Mendel Twersky, son of Rabbi David Twersky, Admor of Skvira.
 Rabbi Baruch Shamshon, Admor of Vizhnitz in Beit Shemesh and Bnei Brak and Rabbi Mordechai's main successor in Israel. Previously served as rabbi of the Vizhnitz community in Beit Shemesh and Rabbi of the Beit Midrash of the Chassidus on Rabbi Meltzer Street in Bnei Brak. Married to Miriam, the daughter of his cousin Rabbi Yisroel Hager, Admor of Vizhnitz in Bnei Brak.
 Golda, married to Rabbi Yitzchak Yechiel Mechl Moskowitz, rabbi of the Shotz community in Monsey, son of Rabbi Yosef Chaim of Shotz in Williamsburg.
 Bracha, married to Nachman Yosef Twersky, son of Rabbi Ze'ev Twersky (head of Yeshivat Maor Einayim and son of Rabbi Yohanan of Rachmastrivka).

Notes

References

External links
 "Second Vizhnitz Rebbe Falls Ill". Israel National News. 20 March 2012.
 "Clouds of Faith ". Mishpacha. October 13, 2016.
 
 http://westchester.news12.com/story/37744891/mourners-say-final-farewell-to-grand-rabbi-in-monsey
 שיחת קודש - מאדמו"ר מוויזשניץ זצ"ל, על רבוה"ק מ'בעלזא | Naftali Reichman

Rabbis from New York City
American Hasidic rabbis
Hasidic rebbes
Rebbes of Vizhnitz
1922 births
2018 deaths
People from Williamsburg, Brooklyn
People from Borough Park, Brooklyn
People from Monsey, New York
People from Oradea
20th-century Romanian rabbis